Brad Cathers is a Canadian politician. He represents the electoral district of Lake Laberge in the Yukon Legislative Assembly on behalf of the Yukon Party. He is currently the longest-serving incumbent in the Assembly.

Political career 
Cathers was first elected to the Yukon Legislative Assembly in the general election of November 4, 2002, and re-elected in the general election of October 10, 2006.  He served as Minister of Health and Social Services and Minister responsible for Yukon Workers' Compensation Health and Safety Board from December 12, 2005 to July 3, 2008; as Minister responsible for Yukon Liquor Corporation and Yukon Lottery Commission from July 3, 2008 to July 6, 2009; and as Minister of Energy, Mines and Resources from July 3, 2008 to August 28, 2009.  He also served as Government House Leader from December 12, 2005 to August 28, 2009.

On August 28, 2009,  Cathers resigned from cabinet and the government caucus to sit as an independent member over issues with then-Premier Dennis Fentie.

On June 29, 2011, Cathers rejoined the government caucus.

On October 11, 2011, Cathers was re-elected for a third term as MLA for Lake Laberge.

Cathers was sworn into Cabinet again on November 5, 2011 as Minister of Energy, Mines and Resources, Minister for Yukon Development Corporation and Yukon Energy Corporation, and Government House Leader.  On August 5, 2013, he became Minister of Community Services, and Minister responsible for Yukon Housing Corporation, Yukon Liquor Corporation and the Yukon Lottery Commission.

In a Cabinet shuffle on January 16, 2015, Cathers was made Minister of Justice, Deputy Government House Leader and, for the second time, Minister for Yukon Development Corporation and Yukon Energy.

34th Legislative Assembly
Cathers was re-elected in his riding of Lake Laberge in the 2016 Yukon election, despite the Yukon Party being swept from office by the Yukon Liberal Party. Following the defeat of former Yukon Party Deputy Premier Elaine Taylor, Cathers is now the longest-serving incumbent MLA in the Yukon Legislative Assembly.

Cathers is currently a member of the Members' Services Board and the Standing Committee on Rules, Elections and Privileges. He is the Yukon Party caucus critic for the Department of Justice, the Department of Finance, the Sustainable Resources Division (agriculture, forestry and land management) of the Department of Energy, Mines and Resources, and the Protective Services Division of the Department of Community Services.

Leadership bid
On December 5, 2019, Cathers announced that he would run in the Yukon Party leadership election, which was held on May 23, 2020. He lost the election to Currie Dixon, placing second on the second ballot.

Cathers was re-elected in the 2021 territorial election.

Personal life

Until early 2007, Cathers was part owner of a wilderness tour company, Cathers Wilderness Adventures. He served as the Wilderness Tourism representative on the Yukon Tourism Education Council from 2000 until his election to the Legislative Assembly in 2002.

Cathers was a member of both the federal Reform Party of Canada and its successor, the Canadian Alliance.

Electoral record

Yukon general election, 2016

|-

| Liberal
| Alan Young
| align="right"| 342
| align="right"| 28.5%
| align="right"| +12.9%

| NDP
| Anne Tayler
| align="right"| 261
| align="right"| 21.8%
| align="right"| -10.7%

|-
! align=left colspan=3|Total
! align=right| 1,199
! align=right| 100.0%
! align=right| –
|}

Yukon general election, 2011

|-

| NDP
| Frank Turner
| align="right"| 330
| align="right"| 32.5%
| align="right"| +17.5%

| Liberal
| Mike Simon
| align="right"| 159
| align="right"| 15.6%
| align="right"| -12.1%
|-
! align=left colspan=3|Total
! align=right| 1,017
! align=right| 100.0%
! align=right| –
|}

Yukon general election, 2006

|-

| Liberal
| John Breen
| align="right"|221
| align="right"|27.6%
| align="right"|+1.5%

| NDP
| Nina Sutherland
| align="right"|120
| align="right"|15.0%
| align="right"|-3.0%
|-
! align=left colspan=3|Total
! align=right| 799
! align=right| 100.0%
! align=right| –
|}

Yukon general election, 2002

|-

| Liberal
| Pam Buckway
| align="right"|218
| align="right"|26.1%
| align="right"|-22.4%

| NDP
| Bill Commins
| align="right"|150
| align="right"|18.0%
| align="right"|+0.8%
|-
! align=left colspan=3|Total
! align=right|834
! align=right|100.0%
! align=right| –
|}

References

External links
Brad Cathers
 http://www.bradcathers.ca/

Yukon Party MLAs
Year of birth missing (living people)
Living people
Independent MLAs in Yukon
21st-century Canadian politicians
Members of the Executive Council of Yukon